Red Lake School District ISD #38 is a school district in Red Lake, unincorporated Beltrami County, Minnesota, on the Red Lake Indian Reservation.

Within Beltrami County the district serves Red Lake, Little Rock, Ponemah, and Redby. It also serves a section of Clearwater County.

Schools
 Red Lake Secondary Complex (formerly Red Lake Senior High School and Red Lake Middle School)
 Ponemah Elementary School (K-8)
 Red Lake Elementary Complex (formerly Red Lake Elementary School)
 Alternative Learning Center

References

External links

 Red Lake School District

School districts in Minnesota
Education in Beltrami County, Minnesota
Clearwater County, Minnesota